Julie Van Dusen is a Canadian journalist who works for CBC News and is seen mainly during The National.

Van Dusen graduated with a degree in French literature and studied communications at  the University of Ottawa. Van Dusen comes from a family of journalists; five of her siblings, including Peter Van Dusen and her father, Thomas Van Dusen, are also reporters. After graduating from university, she began working for the Privy Council Office then as a researcher for FP News Service and Maclean's magazine as a reporter and researcher for the Parliament Hill bureau. Van Dusen began working for the CBC in 1983 at CBC Ottawa. She became a CBC Television news reporter in 1988.

Controversy 
On June 29, 2017, Van Dusen attended a press conference held by a group of family members of Missing and Murdered Indigenous Women and Girls (MMIWG). Van Dusen questioned speakers about Canadian Prime Minister Justin Trudeau’s work with the Indigenous community and one activist responded by referencing one of the many unsolved deaths of young Indigenous teenagers in Thunder Bay, Van Dusen asked, "but how can he be blamed for that? You don’t think that anything he’s doing is helping the situation? Is he an improvement over Stephen Harper? Talk about his record." In response, the Indigenous activists addressed Van Dusen as "white lady", and ordered her to leave the room. When CTV journalist Glen McGregor followed up with a similar question, the activists told him "You're a guest here. Without us you'd be homeless" and cancelled the press conference, walking out of the room. CBC political commentator Martin Patriquin described it as "Racism, sexism, and a press conference gone horribly wrong.".

Prime Minister of Canada Justin Trudeau issued a statement that same day stating, "We recognize that over the past decades, generations, indeed centuries, Canada has failed Indigenous Peoples." The fallout from this event was occurring simultaneously with one in Canada's north where the "British media weren’t impressed when Prince Charles and his wife Camilla had trouble controlling their laughter during a traditional throat singing ceremony in Iqaluit"

References

External links 
 CBC.ca biography

Canadian television reporters and correspondents
Journalists from Ontario
People from Ottawa
Year of birth missing (living people)
Living people
Canadian women television journalists
Canadian people of Dutch descent